Bartow County is located in the eastern part of the U.S. state of Georgia. As of the 2020 census, the population was 108,901, up from 100,157 in 2010. The county seat is Cartersville.

It has a sole commissioner government, and is the largest county by population of the few remaining in Georgia with a sole commissioner.

History
 

Bartow County was created from the Cherokee lands of the Cherokee County territory on December 3, 1832, and named Cass County, after General Lewis Cass (1782–1866), Secretary of War under President Andrew Jackson, Minister to France and Secretary of State under President James Buchanan, who was instrumental in the removal of Native Americans from the area. Cass had supported the doctrine of popular sovereignty, the right of each state to determine its own laws independently of the Federal government, the platform of conservative Southerners who removed his name. The first county seat was at Cassville, but after the burning of the county courthouse and the Sherman Occupation, the seat moved to Cartersville, where it remains.

The county was profoundly affected by the Civil War, setting it back economically for many decades. On May 18 and 19, 1864, General George Henry Thomas led the Army of the Cumberland after General William J. Hardee's Corps of the Army of Tennessee, and General James B. McPherson led his Federal Army of the Tennessee flanking Hardee's army to the west. This huge army was disruptive and sought food. Elements were out of control and sacked homes, depleting meager supplies. Property destruction and the deaths of one-third of the county's soldiers during the war caused financial and social calamity for many.

Slaves gained their freedom, and for over a decade exercised the political franchise through the Republican Party. In 1870, about one black family in 12 owned real estate. More of the blacks lived in white-headed households, working as domestic servants and laborers. The great majority of freed people were day laborers or farm laborers, while a sizable minority occupied skilled positions such as blacksmiths, wheelwrights, and iron workers. By the late 1870s, hardship was experienced by everyone.

Geography

The bulk of Bartow County is located in the Etowah River sub-basin of the ACT River Basin (Alabama-Coosa-Tallapoosa River Basin). The northeastern portion of the county around Rydal is located in the Coosawattee River sub-basin of the same ACT River Basin, while an even smaller northwestern section around Adairsville is located in the Oostanaula River sub-basin of the larger ACT River Basin.

The Etowah is mostly part of Lake Allatoona in southeast Bartow and southwest Cherokee counties, with the Allatoona Dam near Cartersville also impounding Allatoona Creek into northwest Cobb county. The peninsula between the two major arms of the lake is home to Red Top Mountain State Park, east-southeast of Cartersville and just southeast of the dam.

Adjacent counties
 Gordon County – north
 Pickens County – northeast
 Cherokee County – east
 Cobb County – southeast
 Paulding County – south
 Polk County – southwest
 Floyd County – west

Demographics

2000 census
As of 2000, there were 76,019 people, 27,176 households, and 21,034 families living in the county. The population density was 64/km2 (166/mi2). There were 28,751 housing units at an average density of 24 persons/km2 (63 persons/mi2). The racial makeup of the county was 87.79% White, 8.68% African American, 0.28% Native American, 0.51% Asian, 0.03% Pacific Islander, 1.62% from other races, and 1.10% from two or more races. 3.32% of the population were Hispanic or Latino of any race.

There were 27,176 households, out of which 38.20% had children under the age of 18 living with them, 61.90% were married couples living together, 11.10% had a woman whose husband does not live with her, and 22.60% were non-families. 18.70% of all households were made up of individuals, and 6.70% had someone living alone who was 65 years of age or older. The average household size was 2.76 and the average family size was 3.14.

In the county, the population was spread out, with 27.90% under the age of 18, 8.30% from 18 to 24, 33.00% from 25 to 44, 21.40% from 45 to 64, and 9.40% who were 65 years of age or older. The median age was 34 years. For every 100 females, there were 97.70 males. For every 100 females age 18 and over, there were 94.90 males.

The median income for a household in the county was $43,660, and the median income for a family was $49,198. Males had a median income of $35,136 versus $24,906 for females. The per capita income for the county was $18,989. 8.60% of the population and 6.60% of families were below the poverty line. Out of the total people living in poverty, 9.60% were under the age of 18 and 12.20% were 65 or older.

2010 census
As of the 2010 United States Census, there were 100,157 people, 35,782 households, and 26,529 families living in the county. The racial makeup of the county was 82.7% white, 10.2% black or African American, 0.7% Asian, 0.4% American Indian, 0.1% Pacific islander, 3.8% from other races, and 2.1% from two or more races. Those of Hispanic or Latino origin made up 7.7% of the population. In terms of ancestry, 13.9% were American, 10.0% were Irish, 9.3% were English, and 7.8% were German.

Of the 35,782 households, 39.8% had children under the age of 18 living with them, 54.8% were married couples living together, 13.5% had a female householder with no husband present, 25.9% were non-families, and 21.0% of all households were made up of individuals. The average household size was 2.77 and the average family size was 3.20. The median age was 36.2 years.

The median income for a household in the county was $49,216 and the median income for a family was $56,281. Males had a median income of $42,835 versus $31,225 for females. The per capita income for the county was $22,241. About 10.8% of families and 14.0% of the population were below the poverty line, including 18.9% of those under age 18 and 12.1% of those age 65 or over.

2020 census

As of the 2020 United States census, there were 108,901 people, 39,742 households, and 28,529 families residing in the county.

Education
Public education in Bartow County is administered by Bartow County School District and Cartersville City Schools.

Excel Christian Academy and the Trinity School are private institutions.

Politics
Bartow County has voted Republican consistently since 1984. Mitt Romney carried the county in 2012 with 75 percent of the vote. Barack Obama won a small minority of votes in the county, at 23.5 percent, that same year, making Bartow one of the least Democratic counties in Georgia.

Transportation

Major highways

  Interstate 75
  U.S. Route 41
  U.S. Route 411
  State Route 3
  State Route 20
  State Route 20 Spur
  State Route 61
  State Route 113
  State Route 140
  State Route 293
  State Route 293 Connector
  State Route 401 (unsigned designation for I-75)

Secondary highways

 Euharlee Road
 Old S.R. 293. Portion south of Emerson and east of U.S. 41 into Cobb County.
 Old Alabama Road. Future route of S.R. 113.
 Burnt Hickory Road
 Taylorsville-Macedonia Road
 Macedonia Road
 Halls Station Road
 Spring Place Road
 Cassville-White Road
 Glade Road
 Red Top Mountain Rd
 Peeples Valley Rd
 Cassville Rd (Old U.S. 41)

Museums
 Bartow History Museum opened in 1987 and is located in the historic 1869 Courthouse in downtown Cartersville. Artifacts, photographs, documents and a variety of permanent exhibits focus on the settlement and development of Bartow County, Georgia, beginning with the early nineteenth century when the Cherokee inhabited the area. Early European settler life, the iron ore and bauxite industries, Civil War strife, post-war recovery, the Great Depression era, early textile industries and notable figures are depicted through interactive exhibits in the permanent gallery space. The museum offers a wide variety of educational programs and lectures.
 Booth Western Art Museum, an affiliate of the Smithsonian Institution, is a  museum located in Cartersville. Guests are invited to See America's Story through contemporary Western artwork, presidential portraits and letters, Civil War art, more than 200 Native American artifacts, and Sagebrush Ranch children's gallery. Open since August 2003, Booth Museum is the second largest art museum in the state, and houses the largest permanent exhibition space for Western art in the country.
 Tellus Science Museum, an affiliate of the Smithsonian Institution, is a world-class  museum located in Cartersville, just off I-75 at exit 293. The museum features four main galleries: the Weinman Mineral Gallery, the Fossil Gallery, Science in Motion and the Collins Family My Big Backyard. There is also a 120-seat digital planetarium and an observatory with a state-of-the-art 20-inch telescope located at Tellus.
 Euharlee History Museum is located adjacent to the Euharlee Covered Bridge in Euharlee, Georgia, about 9 miles west of downtown Cartersville. The museum opened in 1997 and is a cooperation between the Euharlee Historical Society and the City of Euharlee.
 Adairsville Rail Depot Age of Steam Museum is located in a restored 1847 railroad depot on the Historic Public Square in Adairsville, along with a locally operated welcome center. The museum displays artifacts and pictures covering almost 150 years of life in the area, including the Civil War, the chenille boom, railroad history, early farming implements, and weapons.

Recreation
 Bartow County Georgia Hiking Trails
 Etowah Indian Mounds

Communities

Cities
 Adairsville
 Cartersville
 Emerson
 Euharlee
 Kingston
 White

Town
 Taylorsville

Unincorporated communities
 Atco
 Cassville
 Rowland Springs
 Stilesboro
 Rydal (south of Pine Log)
 Folsom
 Center
 Funkhouser
 Allatoona (mostly lost to Lake Allatoona, but portion remains at Allatoona Pass)

Historical communities

See also

 National Register of Historic Places listings in Bartow County, Georgia
List of counties in Georgia

References

External links
 Bartow County official website
 Antebellum Iron Industry in North Georgia Centered in Bartow County
 Bartow Ancestors - People, Places & History of Bartow County
 Bartow County historical marker

 
1832 establishments in Georgia (U.S. state)
Populated places established in 1832
Georgia (U.S. state) counties
Counties in the Atlanta metropolitan area
Northwest Georgia (U.S.)
Counties of Appalachia